is a Japanese long-distance runner. He competed in the 10,000 metres at the 2015 World Championships in Beijing finishing 23rd.

Yuta Shitara competed in the 2018 edition of the Tokyo Marathon, where he, after falling off the lead pack at 32 km to seventh place, regrouped and advanced position to take second overall, at 2:06:11, which was a new Japanese National Record at the time.  In doing so, he also won a prize of 100 million yen (roughly $936,000) that was offered to any Japanese man who could run a new national record.

International competitions

Personal bests
Outdoor
5000 metres – 13:34.68 (Hiroshima 2015)
10,000 metres – 27:41.97 (Tokyo 2017)
20 kilometres – 58:33 (New York 2012)
Half marathon – 1:00:17 (Ústí nad Labem Half Marathon 2017)
Marathon – 2:06:11 (Tokyo 2018)

References

External links

1991 births
Living people
Place of birth missing (living people)
Japanese male marathon runners
Japanese male long-distance runners
Japanese male middle-distance runners
Athletes (track and field) at the 2016 Summer Olympics
Olympic athletes of Japan
World Athletics Championships athletes for Japan
Universiade medalists in athletics (track and field)
Universiade silver medalists for Japan
Medalists at the 2013 Summer Universiade
21st-century Japanese people